The following is a list of notable guzheng players in alphabetical order.  (Note that in Chinese, the order is surname first followed by given name. See Chinese names.)  The guzheng or zheng is a Chinese musical instrument (specifically a zither) with movable bridges.

Alan Walker 
Chen Huiqing (陈惠清) 
Chen Meilin (陈美霖) 
Chen Xiyao (陈希垚) 
Barbie Chien
Bradley Fish
Jiang Nan (江南)
Mei Han (韩梅)
Lou Harrison
Bei Bei He (荷蓓蓓)
Mike Hovancsek
Cynthia Hsiang (向新梅)
Jaron Lanier
Liang Tsai-Ping (梁在平, Liang Zaiping) (1910–2000)
Zi Lan Liao
Liu Chuyao (劉祖耀, David Chuyao Liu) 
Liu Fang (劉芳)
Liu Weishan (劉維姍)
Fiona Sze-Lorrain
Luo Jing (罗晶)
Ma Li (马丽)
Onette du Joyeux
David Sait
Buedi Siebert
Andreas Vollenweider
Tan Su-Hui, Sophy （陈素慧) 
Wang Changyuan (王昌元)
Wang Fei 
Wang Yong (王勇)
Wang Zhongshan (王中山)  
Winnie Wong（黄凯筠) 
Wu Fei (吴非) 
Vi An Diep
Bing Xia (夏冰)
Xu Fengxia
Xu Lingzi (许菱子)
Yan Xijia (严希佳) 
Yuan Sha (袁莎) 
Mindy Meng Wang
Yu Jun
Zhang Yan (张燕, 1945-1996) 
Zimeimei (子媚)
Lunlun Zou (邹伦伦)
Zhu Lei

References

Lists of musicians